Catherine Ellen Shipton (born 27 March 1957) is an English actress, known for portraying the role of Lisa "Duffy" Duffin in the BBC medical drama Casualty. After leaving the series in 2020, she has since appeared in the Channel 4 soap opera Hollyoaks as Lydia Smith.

Biography
Born to Irish-English parents, Shipton was raised as a Roman Catholic, and was educated in a convent in south London. She studied two languages and journalism, but her drama teacher told her that she had the potential to become an actress, and consequently she trained at Rose Bruford College from 1977 to 1980.

Career 
Shipton was originally considered for the role of receptionist Susie Mercier in the BBC medical drama Casualty, but was eventually cast as nurse Lisa "Duffy" Duffin in 1986, as part of the original cast. She continued to star in the series until 1993, when she chose to leave. She later made a guest appearance in February 1998. Shipton returned as a regular cast member in September 1998, before leaving the series for a second time in 2003. During her second stint on the show, she guest appeared in Casualtys spinoff series Holby City as Duffy. Shipton reprised her role for two episodes in 2006 to celebrate the show's twentieth anniversary celebrations, as well as returning for two further episodes in 2015. In June 2016, it was announced that Shipton would guest appear in the show's thousandth episode, before returning to the show as a regular cast member in August. The character was killed off on 1 February 2020. In August 2021, it was announced that Shipton had been cast in the Channel 4 soap opera Hollyoaks, in the guest role of Lydia.

Filmography

References

External links
 

1957 births
Living people
Actresses from London
People from Lewisham
English Roman Catholics
Alumni of Rose Bruford College
English film actresses
English television actresses
English soap opera actresses
Actresses from Kent